Kyrenia District is one of the six districts of Cyprus. Its main town is Kyrenia. It is the smallest of Cyprus' districts, and is the only one controlled in its entirety by the unrecognised de facto state of Northern Cyprus, where the same territory is administered as the de facto Girne District, a distinct entity.

It is bordered on the south by Nicosia District and on the east and south-east by Famagusta District.  It includes much of the north coast, with the towns of Kyrenia, Lapethos and Karavas. Also the Kyrenia Mountains, which overlook the coast,  with the prominent castles of St. Hilarion and Buffavento.

Unlike the portions of Nicosia, Famagusta and Larnaca under Northern Cyprus' control, which are variously partitioned into five of its six districts, the boundaries of Cyprus' de jure Kyrenia District are coterminous with Northern Cyprus' de facto Girne District.  A district administration-in-exile exists in the Republic of Cyprus-controlled part of the island, near Ledra Palace, while the TRNC district has a kaymakam.

History
Under Lusignan and Venetian rule, Kyrenia District was known as the  contrée (French) or contrade (Italian ) of Cérines, which was one of the eleven  provinces of the Kingdom of Cyprus. At that time, the province of Nicosia, known as the Vicomté, extended closer to the sea, encroaching upon the Pentadaktylos foothills in  the present Kyrenia District.

Under Ottoman Turkish rule, Kyrenia was one of the six cazas into which the island was divided. The Caza of  Kyrenia,  was divided into three nahiehs – Kyrenia, Lefka and Morphou. The caza was headed by a Kaimakan. When the British took control of Cyprus in 1878, these administrative units were retained. But by 1881, Kyrenia Caza was reduced to one nahieh, namely Kyrenia, which covered roughly the same as its present area.

A British officer styled a Commissioner (later District Officer) was appointed for the Caza, while the Turkish Kaimakan was initially retained with certain of his functions.

In 1881 the Caza and Nahieh of Kyrenia had a population of 13,266, (Greek 75%, Turkish 20%), representing 7% of the population of Cyprus. By 1960 the population had grown to 31,015 (Greek 79%, Turkish 14%, Maronite 6%). The Maronite population was almost entirely located in the villages of Kormakiti, Asomatos and Karpaseia.

Settlements
According to Statistical Codes of Municipalities, Communities and Quarters of Cyprus per the Statistical Service of Cyprus (2015), Kyrenia District has 3 municipalities and 44 communities. Municipalities are written with bold.

 Agia Eirini
 Agios Amvrosios
 Agios Epiktitos
 Agios Ermolaos
 Agios Georgios
 Agirda
 Agridaki
 Asomatos
 Bellapais
 Charkeia
 Diorios
 Elia
 Fotta
 Ftericha
 Kalograia
 Kampyli
 Karakoumi
 Karavas
 Karmi
 Karpaseia
 Kato Dikomo
 Kazafani
 Kiomourtzou
 Klepini
 Kontemenos
 Kormakitis
 Koutsovendis
 Krini
 Kyrenia
 Lapithos
 Larnakas tis Lapithou
 Livera
 Motides
 Myrtou
 Orga
 Palaiosofos
 Panagra
 Pano Dikomo
 Pileri
 Sychari
 Sysklipos
 Templos
 Thermeia
 Trapeza
 Trimithi
 Vasileia
 Vouno

References

 
Districts of Cyprus